The Ministry of Irrigation of Syria was responsible managing Syria's water policies. It was established in 1982 as a replacement to the Ministry of Euphrates Dam. The ministry was abolished in June 2012, its agenda was taken over by the Ministry of Water Resources.

Ministers of Irrigation
 Abdul Rahman al-Madani, (1982–2000)
 Taha al-Atrash, (2000 – 13 December 2001)
 Muhammad Radwan Martini (13 December 2001 – 10 September 2003)
 Nader al-Bunni (10 September 2003 – 3 October 2010)
 George Soumi (3 October 2010 – 23 June 2012)

References

External links
 Ministry of Irrigation Official Website (Arabic)

1982 establishments in Syria
Irrigation
Ministries established in 1982
Water in Syria
Syria
Ministries disestablished in 2012
2012 disestablishments in Syria